General Woodford may refer to:

Alexander George Woodford (1782–1870), British Army general
John George Woodford (1785–1879), British Army major general
William Woodford (1734–1780), Continental Army brigadier general